A cairn is a man-made pile of stones.

Cairn may also refer to:

Places 
 Cairn O' Mounth, a high mountain pass in Aberdeenshire, Scotland
 Cairn Toul (from the Gaelic , "Hill of the barn"), the 4th highest mountain in Scotland and the 2nd highest point in the western massif of the Cairngorms
 Cairnbaan, a village in Argyll and Bute, western Scotland.
 Cairness House, a country house in Aberdeenshire, Scotland, built in the 1790s in the Neoclassical style
 Cairneyhill, a small village near Dunfermline in west Fife, Scotland
 Cairngaan, Wigtownshire, the southernmost settlement in Scotland
 Cairnie Hill, a hill in the Ochils, in Fife, Scotland
 Cairnlea, Victoria, a suburb of Melbourne in Australia
  (English: Cairnburgh More), one of the Treshnish Isles in the Inner Hebrides of Scotland
 Cairnpapple Hill, a major Neolithic and Bronze Age ritual site in central lowland Scotland
 Cairnryan, a small village in Dumfries and Galloway, Scotland
 Cairn University, a private Christian university in Langhorne Manor, Pennsylvania
 Cairn Water, a river in Dumfries and Galloway, Scotland 
 Carn Clonhugh ( or ), a hill in County Longford, Republic of Ireland
 Carncastle or Cairncastle, a small village and civil parish in County Antrim, Northern Ireland

People
 John Elliott Cairnes (1823–1875), an Irish economist, described as the "last of the classical economists"

Arts, entertainment, and media
 Cairn.info, a French-language web portal of scholarly materials in the humanities and social sciences
 Cairn, 2021 album by Fergus McCreadie

Other uses
 Cairn circle, another name for a bowl barrow, a type of Neolithic and Bronze Age burial mound or tumulus
 Cairn Energy, one of Europe's leading independent oil and gas exploration and development companies
 Cairn Terrier, one of the oldest of the terrier breeds, originating in the Scottish Highlands and recognized as one of Scotland's earliest working dogs
 Cairn Valley Light Railway, a former rural railway line built to connect the Cairn Valley with the main railway network at Dumfries, closed in the 1940s

See also 
 Cairn Hill (disambiguation)
 Cairncross (disambiguation)
 Cairngorm (disambiguation)
 Cairns (disambiguation)
 Carn